Christina Davis or Davies may refer to:

 Christina Davis (Big Brother Australia), contestant on Big Brother Australia
 Christina Davis (poet), American poet
Christina Davies, character played by Lauren Storm

See also
Christine Davis (disambiguation)
Chris Davis (disambiguation)
Kristina Davis, a fictional character from the soap opera, General Hospital